Maaya (written: 真綾 or 真礼) is a feminine Japanese given name. Notable people with the name include:

, Japanese singer-songwriter, actress and voice actress
, Japanese actress and voice actress
, Japanese footballer

Japanese feminine given names